Justiça (English title: Above Justice) is a 2016 Brazilian miniseries created by	Manuela Dias and that was aired by Rede Globo from 22 August to 23 September 2016 at 11 pm. It was written by Manuela Dias, co-written by Mariana Mesquita, Lucas Paraizo and Roberto Vitorino, and it was directed by Isabella Teixeira, Luísa Lima, Marcus Figueiredo and Walter Carvalho, with general and artistic direction by José Luiz Villamarim.

Set both initially in 2009 and then in 2016 in Recife, each weekly episode follows one of four different set of characters whose stories are interconnected. It stars Adriana Esteves, Julia Dalavia, Marina Ruy Barbosa, Drica Moraes, Antônio Calloni, Cássio Gabus Mendes, Cauã Reymond, Marjorie Estiano, Luisa Arraes, Jéssica Ellen, Jesuíta Barbosa and Débora Bloch at the main roles.

In Brazil, Justiça was received well by viewers and critics alike. The show had a daily reach of approximately 41 million viewers and a total reach of approximately 134 million viewers. The first four episodes were made available on Globoplay before the miniseries premiered on network television.

In 2017, the series was nominated for 45th International Emmy Awards in the best drama series categories and best actress for Adriana Esteves.

Production 
Justiça was shot in Recife, capital of Pernambuco, in an effort by Rede Globo to set some of its works outside of the Rio-São Paulo axis. According to the director, Recife was chosen due to its economic inequality being greater than the rest of the country, which gives the series more veracity. To Villamarim, "Recife is a synthesis of Brazil". In the municipality, Pina Beach, Boa Viagem Beach, Teatro de Santa Isabel, Palácio do Campo das Princesas, Mercado de São José and the Holiday Building were used as filming locations. In Olinda, some streets were used as location such as Ladeira da Misericórdia, among others, as well as Largo do Amparo. In Jaboatão dos Guararapes, the Barra de Jangada Beach was used.
The way the story is told, interconnecting four different stories, was already used in movies such as Short Cuts, Crash and Babel. The cast preparation was done by Chico Accioly and rabbi Nilton Bonder.

Plot 
The miniseries tells a story in each day of the week, in which a search for justice takes place.

Monday (Vicente Menezes) 
Elisa (Débora Bloch) can't overcome the death of her daughter, Isabela (Marina Ruy Barbosa), murdered in 2009 by her own fiancée Vicente (Jesuíta Barbosa) when he caught her cheating on him with an ex-boyfriend. After being released from prison in current time, he seeks forgiveness by his mother-in-law as he starts a new life with Regina (Camila Márdila) and their daughter.

Tuesday (Fátima Libéria do Nascimento) 
Fátima (Adriana Esteves), a maid at Elisa's house, killed a dog belonging to police sergeant Douglas (Enrique Díaz) in 2009 after it hurt her son. She is subsequently incriminated for drug trafficking after Douglas plants some cocaine at her house. Seven years later, when she is released, she wants to reunite with her family, but her husband Waldir (Ângelo Antônio) died, her son Jesus (Bernardo Berruezo/Tobias Carrieres) is homeless and her daughter Mayara (Letícia Braga/Julia Dalavia) became a prostitute.

Thursday (Rose Silva dos Santos) 
Rose (Jéssica Ellen) and Débora (Luisa Arraes) are friends. In 2009, the former is arrested with drugs which actually belonged to some other friends, while the second is spared. Afterwards, Débora is raped. Seven years later, when Rose is released from prison and reunites with her friend, they search for the man who violated her.

Friday (Maurício de Oliveira) 
In 2009, Mauricio (Cauã Reymond) was arrested for killing his wife Beatriz (Marjorie Estiano) at her own request after a hit and run leaves her quadriplegic. The accident was caused by Antenor (Antonio Calloni), who was making a runaway with money he stole from his business partner (Euclydes Menezes (Luiz Carlos Vasconcelos), Vicente's father). Seven years later, when Mauricio is released from prison, he befriends Vânia (Drica Moraes), the troubled wife of Antenor, who now runs for governor of Pernambuco.

Cast

Monday

Tuesday

Thursday

Friday

Episodes

Soundtrack 
 Justiça had as mean theme the song "Hallelujah", a Rufus Wainwright cover for the Leonard Cohen song, that was played in some scenes and trailers'.
"Afterlife", Arcade Fire
 "O Que Será? (À flor da pele)", Chico Buarque com participação de Milton Nascimento
 "O Que Será? (À flor da pele)", Caetano Veloso
 "Pedaço de Mim", Chico Buarque com participação de Zizi Possi
 "Oração", Nuria Mallena
 "Amor Perfeito", Roberto Carlos
 "Gente Aberta", Erasmo Carlos
 "Último Romance", Los Hermanos
 "Risoflora", Elba Ramalho
 "Acabou Chorare", Novos Baianos
 "Revelação", Fagner
 "Crua", Otto
 "Pense em Mim", Johnny Hooker
 "Dona da Minha Cabeça", Geraldo Azevedo
 "Xique-xique", Tom Zé
 "Fui Fiel", ablo

Airing 
The miniseries will be aired after Velho Chico from Monday to Friday except for Wednesdays. For the first time, Globo Repórter will have its timetable changed.

Ratings  
The miniseries premiered with a total viewership of 26.2 points, the highest viewership since Amores Roubados (2014).

Awards and nominations

Notes

References

External links 

 

Brazilian television miniseries
Brazilian drama television series
2016 Brazilian television series debuts
Rede Globo original programming
Television series set in 2009
Television shows set in Recife